Ali Şahin (born 2 January 1970) is a Turkish politician who has been Deputy Minister of European Union Affairs since January 2016. He served as a Member of Parliament for Gaziantep from Justice and Development Party (AKP) between 2011–2015. He was candidated for MP at June 2015 and November 2015 general elections. He could get on the AKP's Gaziantep candidates' lists but didn't succeed to be MP again. He was elected as the TGNA XXVII. period AK Party Gaziantep Deputy in during the 24 June 2018 parliamentary elections He served as the AK Party Deputy Chairman of Social Policies, a member of the Foreign Affairs Committee of the Parliament, and a member of the PACE Turkish Group 
The Sitara-i-Pakistan was Conferred upon him in 2020 by the President of Pakistan, Dr. Arif Alvi. 
 He is on duty as the Chairman of the Turkiye - Pakistan Parliamentary Friendship Group. He was selected as the Administrative Chief of the Presidency of the Grand National Assembly of Turkey on 9 July 2020 On January 6, 2022, he was selected as the Head of the Turkish Delegation of the Latin American and Caribbean Parliament (Parlatino) in the Turkish Grand National Assembly 

Şahin finished his bachelor and master degree in International Relations from Karachi University, Pakistan from 1990-1997 He is married, has two children and he is fluent in English, Urdu and Arabic

References 

1970 births
Living people
Justice and Development Party (Turkey) politicians
University of Karachi alumni
Members of the 24th Parliament of Turkey
Turkish Sunni Muslims
Deputy ministers of Turkey
Deputies of Gaziantep
People from Nizip
Turkish expatriates in Pakistan